Mahurestan may refer to:
 Mahurestan-e Olya, Isfahan Province
 Mahurestan, Markazi